Bromfield railway station was a station in Bromfield, Shropshire, England. The station was opened in 1852 and closed for regular passenger train services in 1958. but was occasionally used for special trains on race days until around 1965.

The station buildings and platforms were replaced by a factory.

References

Further reading

Disused railway stations in Shropshire
Railway stations in Great Britain opened in 1852
Railway stations in Great Britain closed in 1958
Former Shrewsbury and Hereford Railway stations